Heinrich Plhak (26 June 1894 – 7 August 1957) was an Austrian footballer. He played in four matches for the Austria national football team from 1913 to 1916.

References

External links
 

1894 births
1957 deaths
Austrian footballers
Austria international footballers
Place of birth missing
Association footballers not categorized by position